

William Henry Savigny (17 February 1864 – 6 August 1922) was an Australian cricketer and academic.

Biography
Savigny was born in Sydney, the elder son of Rev. William Henry Savigny, from 1872 headmaster of Launceston Church Grammar School, and educated at his father's school. He won a scholarship to Corpus Christi College, Oxford University, where he earned his BA degree in Law and a blue for rowing.

While at Oxford he played two two-day matches for Shropshire in 1885 while also playing club cricket at Shrewsbury. He played four first-class matches for Tasmania between 1888 and 1896.

He returned to Launceston, where he practised law with his brother-in-law John Singleton Clemons, then when Clemons entered politics (he became one of Tasmania's first Senators) he took a position with Sydney Grammar School and for 26 years taught English and Classics and coached athletics and the college rowing teams.

Savigny died after suffering a stroke while riding his bicycle in the Sydney suburb of Strathfield. In 1923 a memorial in the form of a brass plaque was unveiled at Sydney Grammar School in his memory.

Family
Savigny married Mary Eveline Smith ( – 22 July 1938) in Sheffield, England, on 18 March 1890 and had two daughters:
Katherine Savigny (15 February 1891 – )
Ellen Maude Savigny (25 March 1895 – )
His brother John Savigny was a noted cricketer.

References

External links
 

1864 births
1922 deaths
Australian cricketers
Tasmania cricketers
Cricketers from Sydney
Australian educators
Australian rowing coaches
Australian athletics coaches